Gabriela Alejandra Guzmán Pinal (born February 9, 1968), known professionally as Alejandra Guzmán, and nicknamed "La Reina de Corazones" (The Queen of Hearts) is a Mexican musician, singer, composer, and actress. With more than 30 million albums sold throughout her career, and winner of a Latin Grammy, she is one of the most successful  Mexican female singers. She is the daughter of actress Silvia Pinal and singer Enrique Guzmán.

Early life and career 
Gabriela Alejandra Guzmán Pinal was born February 9, 1968, in Mexico City, to her mother Silvia Pinal’s third marriage. Guzmán has three siblings: two older half-sisters, actress Sylvia Pasquel and Viridiana Alatriste. Her younger brother, Luis Enrique Guzmán is her only sibling from the same father and mother.

Her first song Bye Mamá, a song dedicated to her mom was the start to her career in 1988. In 1990s, she released several of her biggest albums like Eternamente Bella, Flor de Piel, as well as Libre which launched with a signed contract to BMG Ariola. Her success placed her in being nominated to a Grammy, Latin Grammy, and her albums to be labeled Gold and Platinum.

With all her success, she has been labeled to be La Reina del Rock, and one of the most successful female artists of Mexico.

Throughout her career, she has had success throughout Mexico and the United States. She has done duets with Franco De Vita, Mario Domm, Fonseca, and the most known Gloria Trevi. Her along with Trevi had several duets together and did the Versus Tour together from 2017-2018.

She served as judge of the second season of Va Por Ti. She also served as coach of La Voz...México. On July 5, 2018, Telemundo announced Alejandra Guzmán as a coach on La Voz (U.S.). Guzmán joined Luis Fonsi, Carlos Vives and Wisin as coaches on the Spanish-language version of NBC singing-competition The Voice. In 2020, Amazon announced her starring role in the Amazon Prime series "El juego de las llaves".

Personal life 
Alejandra Guzman grew up in the entertainment world, having two superstars as her parents.  She had her fair share of being bullied, but managed to pull through.  At age 14, the death of her older sister Viridiana Alatriste, who died in a car crash, was one of the saddest moments in her life.  After her sister's passing, she became quite rebellious and enjoyed life to the fullest.  She routinely sneaked out of her house to join the vibrant night-life of Mexico City.  During those times, Alejandra met Kenny Aviles from the band Kenny y Los Electricos who became her rock mother/mentor.  It was then that she came to realize she belonged on the stage.  Alejandra Guzmán has had several relationships throughout her life. Her first public relationship was with Erik Rubin which did not last long due to conflict with Mexican singer Paulina Rubio over him. She later started a relationship with Pablo Moctezuma, a businessman with whom Guzmán has a daughter, Frida Sofía, born March 1992. She and Moctezuma later separated.

Guzmán married American businessman Farrell Goodman in 1998. The marriage was destroyed right after, when Goodman was arrested due to carrying narcotics in an airport in Germany. Her last public relationship to date was a little after her divorce from Goodman, with Gerardo Gómez de la Borbolla. They initially had a great relationship but things ended after she suffered a miscarriage and fell into a deep depression, during which time he also wanted to be part of her work team as well as launching a singing career of his own. Alejandra revealed years later that she ended up having an abortion from a second pregnancy with him.

In 2007 she was diagnosed with breast cancer and was able to survive due to early detection.  In 2009 Alejandra almost died a few months after she had butt enhancement injections from unlicensed estheticians.  She was injected with polymers which caused infections and for several years she has had over 30 surgical procedures to remove them from her body.

Since 2020 Guzmán and her daughter Frída Sofía have been estranged. In 2021 Frída Sofía caused a huge scandal by asserting that Guzmán's father Enrique had sexually molested her since she was 5. Guzmán has sided fully with her father, who denies the accusations and has stated she hopes this will be solved soon enough.

In 2020, Guzmán changed management to US/Mexico-based agency All Parts Move. 

In 2021, she joined the cast of the second season of the Amazon Prime Video series El Juego de las Llaves created by Marisa Quiroga, and produced by Amazon Studios, Corazón Films, and Pantaya. Guzmán was also a featured performer on the American music TV series A Tiny Audience produced by February Entertainment. for HBO Max and aired in Latin America by DirecTV Latam.

The show included cameos by their mothers, Mexican actresses Silvia Pinal and Susana Dosamantes. In 2022 Alejandra Guzmán and Paulina Rubio, embarked on a 20-city US tour. The mostly sold-out, historic PERRÍSIMAS US TOUR 2022 kicked off in April 2022, and included major cities such as Chicago, El Paso, New York, Miami, and Las Vegas, before wrapping up on May 22 in Los Angeles.

In July 2022, La Guzmán kicked off her TUYA TOUR with a sold-out show at the Arena CDMX  joined by special guests Silvia Pinal, Fey, Erik Rubín, and Aleks Syntek. In November 2022, Guzmán will perform a series of concerts at the Venetian Las Vegas.

Discography

Discography

Compilation albums
 Reina de Corazones
 15 Éxitos
 Fuerza (Spanish edition)

Live albums
 La Guzmán
 Alejandra Guzman En Vivo
 20 Años de Éxitos En Vivo con Moderatto
 La Guzmán: Primera Fila
 La Guzmán Live at the Roxy

Singles

Tours 

 Dame Tu Amor Tour (1990)
 Eternamente Bella Tour (1991)
 Flor de Papel Tour (1992)
 Libre Tour (1993–94)
 Enorme Tour (1995–96)
 Cambio de Piel Tour (1997)
 La Guzman Tour (1998)
 Algo Natural Tour (1999-2000)
 Soy Tour (2002)
 Supersexitada Tour (2004–05)
 Indeble (2006–07)
 Fuerza Tour (2008–09)
 Unico Tour (2010)
 20 Años de Éxitos Tour (2011–12)
 La Guzman Primera Fila Tour (2014)
 Rock Recargado Tour (2015)
 A + No Poder Tour (2016)
 Versus Tour (2017–18)
 Perrísimas US Tour (2022) (with Paulina Rubio)
 Eternas Tour (2023) (with Fey)

Awards won
 Latin Grammy 2002: "Best Rock Solo Album" (Soy)
 Winner of ASCAP Latin Award: Pop Balad: "Volverte a Amar" (2006) / “Soy sólo un Secreto” (2009) / “Día de Suerte’ (2012)
 "La Luna" Del Auditorio Nacional” Award: Best Live Latin Rock Performance
 Premio Oye! 2006: " Album of the Year" and "Best Female Artist"
 Premios Juventud 2010: Best Rock Artist
 Premios Juventud 2012: Mejor Tema Novelero “Día de Suerte”

Honorary Award
 2013 PADRES Contra el Cancer (I Am Hope) 
La Musa Award 2015 Latin songwriter

Nominations
Grammy Awards
 1991 "Best Latin Pop Album" for the album "Flor de papel"; 2004 "Latin Rock / Alternative album" for “Lipstick”
Latin Grammy Awards
 2000 "Best Female Rock Vocal Performance" for the song "Algo Natural"; 2005 "Best Rock Solo album" for "Lipstick" and "Best Rock song" for "Lipstick”; 2006 "Best Rock Vocal album" for "Indeleble" and "Best Rock Song" for "Volverte a Amar"; 2008 “Best Female Pop Vocal Album” for “Fuerza”; 2011 “Record of the Year”/ “Best Short Form Music Video” for Tan Solo Tu (A Duo with Franco de Vita)
 Billboard Latin Music Awards; 2005 "Latin Rock / Alternative album of the year" for "Lipstick“
Premio Lo Nuestro
 2007 "Artist of the year" / "Album of the year" for "Indeleble" / "Song of the year" for "Volverte a amar”; 2008 /“Female Artist of the Year” / “Album of the Year” for “Fuerza”, “Song of the Year” for "Soy solo un Secreto"; 2012 “Rock Album of the Year” for “20 Años de Éxitos en Vivo con Moderatto”/ “Rock Artist of the Year”/ “Rock Song of the Year” for “Día de Suerte”/ “Collaboration of the Year” for “Día de Suerte” with Moderatto; 2013 “Artist of the year”
Premios Juventud
 2011 "My Rock Artist"

References

External links
 

1968 births
Living people
Pinal family
Singers from Mexico City
Mexican women singers
Women in Latin music
Rock en Español musicians
Latin Grammy Award winners
Latin music songwriters
Actresses from Mexico City
Mexican film actresses
Universal Music Latin Entertainment artists